Deborah Ruth Lurie is an American composer, arranger, and music producer. Her work has appeared in films such as Dear John, An Unfinished Life, Safe Haven, and 9. She has also been a string arranger for rock and pop performers such as Katy Perry, Kelly Clarkson, and The All-American Rejects. In 2015, she received the ASCAP Shirley Walker Award to honor her achievements contributing to the diversity of film and television music. She was one of the composers interviewed in Score: A Film Music Documentary. The Academy of Motion Picture Arts and Sciences extended membership to her in 2016 for her contributions to motion pictures.

Filmography

Composer

Arranger/Producer 

The SpongeBob Movie: Sponge Out of Water (song arranger)
Annie (additional arranger)
Mystic Manor (arranger, music by Danny Elfman)
Much Ado About Nothing (arranger/producer, score by Joss Whedon)
Fame (song arranger)
Bad Santa (song arranger)
Charlie's Angels: Full Throttle (song arranger)

Orchestrations 

Men in Black 3 (score by Danny Elfman)
The X-Files: I Want to Believe (score by Mark Snow)
The Curse of El Charro (score by Rich Ragsdale)
X2 (score by John Ottman)
Urban Legends: Final Cut (score by John Ottman)
Crazy in Alabama (score by Mark Snow)
Halloween H20: 20 Years Later (score by John Ottman)  
The X-Files (score by Mark Snow)
Dexter's Laboratory (add. orch., score by Thomas Chase and Steve Rucker)
The Day Lincoln Was Shot (score by Mark Snow)
Barney's Great Adventure (add. orch., score by Van Dyke Parks)

String Arranger 

2002
Gabriel Mann, Tug of War
The Buzzhorn, Disconnected

2003
Hoobastank, The Reason
Adema, Unstable
Cold, Year of the Spider

2005
The All-American Rejects, Move Along
Vendetta Red, Sisters of the Red Death

2006
Daughtry, Daughtry
Hoobastank, Every Man for Himself
Hoobastank, DVD - Live at La Cigale
Papa Roach, The Paramour Sessions
Caleb Kane, Go Mad
Three Days Grace, One-X
Peter Bradley Adams, Gather Up

2008
Paul Freeman, You and I
The All-American Rejects, When the World Comes Down
Third Day, Revelation
Theory of a Deadman, Scars & Souvenirs

2009
Adam Lambert, For Your Entertainment
All American Rejects, Soundtrack 90210
Allison Iraheta, Just Like You
Kelly Clarkson, All I Ever Wanted
Daughtry, Leave This Town
Creed, Full Circle
The Red Jumpsuit Apparatus, Lonely Road
Katy Perry,Thinking of You live on Ellen and MTV Unplugged
Halestorm, Halestorm

2010
Bon Jovi, "What Do You Got?"
Hawthorne Heights, Skeletons

2011
3 Doors Down, Time of My Life
Theory of a Deadman, The Truth Is...
Kelly Clarkson, Stronger
Christina Perri, The Twilight Saga: Breaking Dawn Soundtrack

2013
Brandi Carlile, Safe Haven Original Motion Picture Soundtrack

2014
Theory of a Deadman, Savages

2015
Theory of a Deadman

2016
Simple Plan, Taking One for the Team

References

External links
 
 

American film score composers
Women film score composers
Living people
Musicians from Boston
USC Thornton School of Music alumni
Varèse Sarabande Records artists
Year of birth missing (living people)